Frank Lesiputty (born 26 August 1967) is  a former Australian rules footballer who played with Footscray in the Victorian Football League (VFL).

Notes

External links 
		

Living people
1967 births
Australian rules footballers from Victoria (Australia)
Western Bulldogs players
Werribee Football Club players